Star Hall is a historic building in Moab, Utah. It was built in 1905-1906 by the Church of Jesus Christ of Latter-day Saints for the Moab Ward after Bishop Randolph H. Stewart and second counselor Orlando W. Warner purchased the land from Leonard Leonidas Crapo, and it was designed in the Richardsonian Romanesque style. The building was later acquired by the Grand County School District. It has been listed on the National Register of Historic Places since May 14, 1993.

References

Buildings and structures completed in 1906
National Register of Historic Places in Grand County, Utah
Richardsonian Romanesque architecture in Utah
1906 establishments in Utah